Overlake Medical Center is a 349-bed non-profit community hospital located in Bellevue, Washington.  The hospital opened in 1960, and operates a level III emergency department.

In the last year with available data, the hospital had about 53,572 emergency department visits, 20,562 in-patient visits, 7,073 in-patient surgeries, and 7,512 outpatient surgeries. The hospital is accredited by the joint commission. The hospital has a da Vinci surgical robot that is used for surgical procedures.

History
Overlake Medical Center originally opened in 1960 at a cost of $1.2 million. The hospital opened a helicopter landing pad in 2009 to receive cardiac and stroke patients.

References

External links
 Overlake Medical Center & Clinics homepage

Hospital buildings completed in 1960
Hospitals established in 1960
Hospitals in Washington (state)
Buildings and structures in Bellevue, Washington